The Shadow Ministry of Kevin Rudd was the opposition Australian Labor Party shadow ministry of Australia from December 2006 to December 2007, opposing John Howard's Coalition ministry.

Leader of the Opposition: Kevin Rudd
Deputy Leader of the Opposition, Shadow Minister for Employment, Industrial Relations and Social Inclusion: Julia Gillard
Leader of the Opposition in the Senate, Shadow Minister for National Development, Resources and Energy: Chris Evans
Shadow Treasurer: Wayne Swan
Shadow Minister for Foreign Affairs: Robert McClelland
Shadow Minister for Defence: Joel Fitzgibbon
Shadow Minister for Finance: Lindsay Tanner
Shadow Minister for Health and Ageing: Nicola Roxon
Shadow Attorney-General, Manager of Opposition Business in the Senate: Joe Ludwig
Shadow Minister for Climate Change, Environment, Heritage and the Arts: Peter Garrett
Shadow Minister for Water and Infrastructure, Manager of Opposition Business in the House: Anthony Albanese
Shadow Minister for Communications and Information Technology, Deputy Leader of the Opposition in the Senate: Stephen Conroy
Shadow Minister for Trade and Regional Development: Simon Crean
Shadow Minister for Immigration, Integration and Citizenship: Tony Burke
Shadow Minister for Education and Training: Stephen Smith
Shadow Minister for Families and Community Services, Indigenous Affairs and Reconciliation: Jenny Macklin
Shadow Minister for Industry, Innovation, Science and Research: Kim Carr
Shadow Minister for Transport, Roads and Tourism: Martin Ferguson
Shadow Minister for Primary Industries, Fisheries and Forestry: Kerry O'Brien
Shadow Minister for Human Services, Housing, Youth and Women: Tanya Plibersek
Shadow Minister for Homeland Security, Territories, Shadow Minister for Justice and Customs: Arch Bevis

This opposition made no distinction between the Shadow Cabinet and the Shadow Ministry

Opposition of Australia
Rudd